Lucas Daniel de la Torre (born May 23, 1998) is an American professional soccer player who plays as a midfielder for La Liga club Celta and the United States national team.

Having begun his professional career with Fulham in the EFL Championship, he later played for Heracles in the Eredivisie and Celta in La Liga. A full international for the United States since 2018, he was selected for the 2022 FIFA World Cup.

Club career

Early career
De la Torre was born and raised in San Diego, California, and began playing soccer at Nomads SC and the San Diego Surf SC, before moving to England to play with Fulham in 2013. De la Torre made his debut for Fulham on August 9, 2016, in the EFL Cup first round against Leyton Orient, starting the match and played 88 minutes at Brisbane Road as Fulham won 3–2. His first league game was a Championship match against Bolton Wanderers on October 28, 2017, as a last-minute substitute for Tomáš Kalas in a 1–1 home tie.

He scored his only  goal for Fulham in an EFL Cup tie against Millwall on September 25, 2018.

Heracles
On August 6, 2020, de la Torre signed a two-year deal with Eredivisie side Heracles Almelo. He provided an assist in his Eredivisie debut on September 13, 2020, in a 2–0 win over ADO Den Haag. He was named to the Eredivisie Team of the Month for March 2021, having scored his first goal on March 7 as a late winner in a 2–1 home victory over PEC Zwolle. He was again named to the Eredivisie Team of the Month for January 2022.

Celta de Vigo 
On July 7, 2022, de la Torre signed a four-year deal with Celta de Vigo of La Liga. He was the second player of American nationality to play for the club, after Italy international Giuseppe Rossi. He made his debut on August 20 in a 4–1 home loss to Real Madrid, playing the final three minutes in place of Renato Tapia. 

Having only made brief substitute appearances under manager Eduardo Coudet, de la Torre took more part in the team when Carlos Carvalhal arrived. On December 22, he came off the bench away to Gernika in the second round of the Copa del Rey and scored his first goal within ten minutes to conclude a 3–0 victory. In the next round on January 3, 2023, he made his first start, though the team lost 3–1 at fellow top-flight team Espanyol in overtime.

International career

Youth
De la Torre was part of the United States under-17 team for the 2015 CONCACAF U-17 Championship and 2015 FIFA U-17 World Cup.

He was also part of the United States under-20 team that won the 2017 CONCACAF U-20 Championship, scoring the game-winner in a 4–1 group stage win against Haiti and netting a penalty kick during the penalty shootout in the final against Honduras. He was also a member of the United States squad that reached the 2017 FIFA U-20 World Cup quarterfinals, scoring a goal in a group stage draw against Ecuador and assisting on both Josh Sargent's game-winner in a group stage match against Senegal as well as Lagos Kunga's goal in a 6–0 Round of 16 win over New Zealand.

Senior
On June 2, 2018, de la Torre made his senior team debut for the United States, coming on as a substitute in a friendly against Republic of Ireland. On February 2, 2022, he made his first start for the United States against Honduras in a 3–0 victory in World Cup Qualifying.

De la Torre recovered from a muscular injury suffered in October 2022 in time to be chosen for the World Cup in Qatar the following month. He did not feature in any games as the United States reached the last 16.

Personal life
De la Torre's father is Spanish, and his mother is American. As a result, he holds a Spanish passport.

Career statistics

Club

International

Honors
United States U20
CONCACAF U-20 Championship: 2017

References

External links
Profile of Luca de la Torre

1998 births
Living people
Soccer players from San Diego
American soccer players
United States men's international soccer players
United States men's youth international soccer players
United States men's under-20 international soccer players
American people of Spanish descent
Association football midfielders
Nomads Soccer Club players
San Diego Surf SC players
Fulham F.C. players
Heracles Almelo players
RC Celta de Vigo players
English Football League players
Eredivisie players
La Liga players
2022 FIFA World Cup players
Expatriate footballers in England
Expatriate footballers in the Netherlands
Expatriate footballers in Spain
American expatriate soccer players
American expatriate sportspeople in England
American expatriate sportspeople in the Netherlands
American expatriate sportspeople in Spain